Anshul Gupta (born 20 September 1989) is an Indian first-class cricketer who plays for Services.
He made his List A debut for Services in the 2012–13 Vijay Hazare Trophy on 13 February 2013. He made his Twenty20 debut for Services in the 2010–11 Inter State Twenty-20 Tournament on 22 October 2011. He made his first-class debut on 2 November 2012 for Services in the 2012–13 Ranji Trophy.

References

External links
 

1989 births
Living people
Indian cricketers
Services cricketers
Cricketers from Ghaziabad, Uttar Pradesh